Yogesh Chander Deveshwar (4 February 1947 – 11 May 2019) was an Indian businessman. He was the chairman of ITC Limited.  He was the longest-serving CEO of any Indian company.

Early life
Yogesh Chander Deveshwar was born on 4 February 1947 in Lahore, British India. He received a bachelor's degree in mechanical engineering from the Indian Institute of Technology, Delhi in 1968. He later attended the six-week Advanced Management Program at Harvard Business School.

Career
Deveshwar joined ITC Limited in 1968. He was appointed a main board director in 1984 and became the CEO and chairman in January 1996. Deveshwar was due to step down as head of ITC in 2010.

He was a director on the central board of the Reserve Bank of India, a member of the National Foundation for Corporate Governance, and a member of the governing body of the National Council of Applied Economic Research.

Deveshwar was India's longest-serving CEO at the time of his death, and earned nearly triple the second-highest salary in his company. In 2011, it was reported that his salary was 26 lakh (2.6 million) rupees per month. In 2013, he was listed as the best performing CEO in India by Harvard Business Review and seventh in the world. He served as the president of the Confederation of Indian Industry in 2005-06. In 2011, Deveshwar received the Padma Bhushan, India's third-highest civilian award.

Death 
Deveshwar died on 11 May 2019, and although the immediate cause of death was not announced, it was known that he had been diagnosed with cancer a few years before.

References

External links
 How Yogi Deveshwar changed ITC
 Y C Deveshwar named `Business Person of the Year' by UK Government

1947 births
2019 deaths
Indian chief executives
IIT Delhi alumni
Indian hoteliers
Recipients of the Padma Bhushan in trade and industry
Deaths from cancer in India
Reserve Bank of India
ITC Limited